Lonzell Ramon Hill (born September 25, 1965) is a former American football wide receiver who played four seasons in the NFL for the New Orleans Saints. His father, J. D. Hill, also played wide receiver in the NFL.

Career
In 2007, Hill became the Salvation Army's social services director in Renton, Washington. Prior to his position in Renton, he was the youth director at the Seattle YMCA. Later on, Hill became a youth interim director at the YMCA in Cincinnati.

See also
 Washington Huskies football statistical leaders

References 

1965 births
Living people
Players of American football from Stockton, California
American football wide receivers
Washington Huskies football players
New Orleans Saints players